Ola Dybwad-Olsen (born 4 August 1946 in Oslo) is a former Norwegian footballer who played as a striker for Lyn, Stabæk and Norway. During his fourteen-year career at Lyn he came to be regarded as one of the greatest players in the club's history. He holds several club records.

Career

Club career

Dybwad-Olsen made his debut for Lyn in 1964 and was part of the title-winning Lyn team of the 1960s. He became Cup Champion with Lyn in 1967, scoring one of the goals in the final (4-1 win against Rosenborg). In the club's most successful year, 1968, he set a still unbeaten club record of scoring 25 goals in 18 league games, and helped Lyn win The Double by scoring in his second consecutive cup final (3-0 win against Mjøndalen).

Ola Dybwad-Olsen made 420 appearances for Lyn from 1964 until 1978. Of these, 142 were games in the 1st Division, in which he scored 69 goals. In a total of 219 league appearances (142 in the 1st Division and 77 in the 2nd Division), he scored 119 goals. 

In 1979, he moved across the city border to Bærum and Stabæk, where he played for three years before retiring in 1982, at the age of 36.

International career
Ola Dybwad-Olsen was capped 24 times for his national team, from 1968 to 1972, scoring 11 goals. He debuted against Poland on 9 July 1968. He also featured on the U-21 team (5 games) and the U-19 team (2 games).

Personal life
His son, Ola Dybwad-Olsen Junior, is a professional footballer who also played for Lyn.

References

1946 births
Living people
Norwegian footballers
Norway international footballers
Lyn Fotball players
Stabæk Fotball players

Association football forwards
Footballers from Oslo